NA-107 Toba Tek Singh-III is a constituency for the National Assembly of Pakistan.

Members of Parliament

2018-2022: NA-113 Toba Tek Singh-III

Election 2002 

General elections were held on 10 Oct 2002. Riaz Fatiana an Independent candidate won by 67,603 votes.

Election 2008 

General elections were held on 18 Feb 2008. Riaz Fatiana of PML-Q won by 63,444 votes.

Election 2013 

General elections were held on 11 May 2013. Asad Ur Rehman of PML-N won by 103,581 votes and became the  member of National Assembly.

Election 2018 
General elections were held on 25 July 2018.

See also
NA-106 Toba Tek Singh-II
NA-108 Jhang-I

References

External links
 Election result's official website

Toba Tek Singh